Kepa Akixo aka Zigor, is a sculptor, photographer,  artist and poet. He was born in 1947 in Aretxabaleta, (a town in the province of Gipuzkoa), in the Southern Basque Country.

His poems were published commencing 1973, and he travelled the world as a photojournalist for major news magazines and the Capa press agency until 1982. Then, in 1983, he decided to give full rein to his creativity through sculpture and rapidly joined the ranks of great contemporary Basque sculptors. Zigor draws inspiration from nature, giving new form to its original movement of organized chaos. Sculptures, photographs, paintings and poems reverberate together and convey the archaic, ubiquitous strength of a world and humanity bound together by their roots.

Biography

Early life, political activism and writing 
Kepa Akixo was born in 1947 and grew up in a small mountain village in the province of Guipuzcoa, in the Southern Basque Country. Somewhat of a tearaway child and a recalcitrant student, at the age of eleven he joined the Catholic seminary boarding school in Saturraran where he discovered the ocean and biblical texts. Encountering the metaphysics and profundity of both the sea and sacred writings was a decisive factor in Zigor's development as an autodidact. At the age of 14, he worked as a fitter and turner, and excelled in the sport of Basque pelota. Reflexes conditioned as a labourer and pelotari were to have a significant impact on his artistic kinesics to come, with repeated momentum from the wall to the work.

For several years, from the age of 16, Kepa Akixo became fully committed to political activism in the midst of the Franco dictatorship. In addition to spiritual texts, he wrote of resistance striving for a free Basque Country, both its entity and its language. It was during this period that he adopted his nom de plume Zigor, the Basque word for "whip", and laid bare the roots of organic poetry in which fragility is revealed at its most robust, whether in nature, form or humankind.

It was at the beginning of the 1970s that Zigor published his first collections of poems in the Basque language and he has been published every year since then in the Basque review Poesiaren hatsa and Maiatz. His poems, a cross between solitary strolls and haïkus, are now translated in French, Spanish and English.

"I am the son of a language that made a people. Of a language that, in mulling over the world, shaped the landscape. I am the son of a language, and this language has given shape to song, dreams and silence. I shout it out so that it reaches you." Zigor, son of a language.

Photography and travels 
In 1977, he became a photojournalist for major news magazines and the Capa press agency. He travelled the world until 1982, especially in the Sahara desert, and these life experiences chronicled, in his eyes, the shared fabric of land and language. This profound awareness influenced his perspective and his photos, between instinct and epiphany. After his career as a photojournalist, Zigor did not touch his Leica for several years. It was in the 2010s that he felt the need to pick up this contemplative tool once again, but this time with a totally artistic focus. No colours, which he considers to be a distraction. Portraits and landscapes juxtapose Zigor's photographic work, in which black and white perpetuates the perceived poetic texture.

An appointment with sculpture 
It was in 1983, upon being commissioned to take a portrait of the sculptor Remigio Mendiburu that Zigor ventured into his subject's workshop in Hondarribia. It proved to be a revelation for Zigor, who decided to devote himself to this art whose force and sensual resonance he so keenly felt: an art form embracing thought that is continuously disrupted and continuously renewed. He set up his workshop in Biarritz and his name joined those of great contemporary Basque Country sculptors, such as Nestor Basterretxea, Eduardo Chillida, Jorge Oteiza, where the art of sculpture stands intrinsically linked to the motherland.

Body of work and artistic process

Importance of the sketchbook for Zigor 
Sketchbooks open the door to the artist's imagination and trace the genesis of his work. Sketches, outlines, rough drawings are the murmurings of work in the making, still dewy from the moment it was reaped, like a feeling that is taking shape. A few words, but not yet a sentence, that the exchange with substance will later reveal.

"The sketch is a humble stone pointing the way between thought and hand." 
— Zigor, The sketch.

Painting or the extension of a stroke 
Painting (watercolour, chalk, oil, gouache, acrylic or walnut ink) is the same process that spills out of the sketchbook to take on all its magnitude, sometimes on canvases measuring 3m50, hoisted like imaginary fronton pelota walls.

Sculpture 
Zigor's work explores several materials and elements in order to convey the same density: wood (oak, plane tree, chestnut and beech), bronze, steel. Happenstance seems to play a role in each work that expresses mass and movement, separation and fusion, fracture and regained balance.

A struggle can be detected between volumes, gravity and space that, by ingenious innate order, end up by merging and falling back into place.  Zigor's sculptures, witnesses to this "organized chaos", have no end. The lines seamlessly fuse and each angle of vision portrays a new piece that invites wind, water and light to pass through it. 

It is in the infinitely subtle that this tellurian orchestrator of sometimes gigantic constructions draws his source of inspiration. From the drop of water that bends a blade of grass without snapping it to the delicate wings of birds that withstand all the winds that blow.

Dimensions of spirituality and identity subtly occupy Zigor's work. "I sculpt like I pray", he says and this state of consciousness, embracing perception of beauty and hard-won freedom, also recounts a captive state of nothingness, convinced that poetry can perceptibly change the world.

"In the shadow of sculptures hides darkness,

And in darkness the shape of mystery,

And in mystery all the shapes."

- Zigor, In the shadow of sculptures

From infinitely small to monumental 
It was in 1996, after meeting the art dealer Paul Haim, that Zigor began working with bronze, fascinated by the play of light on this material.Zigor's monumental sculptures are represented in numerous collections in the Basque Country, Spain, Australia (Sydney), the United States (Washington and New York), Switzerland and Argentina. They stand in private gardens and public spaces, like the Urkulu fountain in Biarritz, witness to a rock's melancholy on seeing the wave recede.

"The sculpture is not the structure in bronze but rather the water that sings inside it."

– Zigor, Urkulu.

And so Zigor creates a totemic work, an entire Basque Country in his imagination.

"The landscape that surrounds me has always moved me and accompanied me in my deeper understanding of the world. When I sculpt, paint, take photographs and write, I'm just trying to recount this feeling. In the creative act, my little sketchbooks are very often the source of most of my works. But the pieces themselves follow very mysterious paths connected not only to the medium and tool used but also my doubts and my courage. Especially courage, which is necessary in order to continue along the path dictated by what appears in front of me. Honouring mishaps is the cornerstone of the creative act. What a mistake it would be to believe that I could improve or solve the unsolvable. I don't know what the sculptures and paintings will be. It's only a perpetual attempt to keep alive the inspiration that galvanized me at the start."

Chronology of his works

Sculpture, major exhibitions 
 2021 ; Egu iturria, la source de l'aube, Espace muséal du Bellevue - Biarritz
 2019 ; Rendez-vous avec Zigor, Galerie Dehoux - Saint-Jean-de-Luz
 2018 ; Itzalean ikusi, voir dans l'ombre, Espace muséal du Bellevue - Biarritz
 2014 ; Le silence des formes, Musée de la Vallée de la Creuse - Eguzon-Chantôme
 2013 ; Le silence des formes, Galerie Maison Gérard - New York
 2012 ; Ibaiadar, Galerie Hegoa, Carré Rive Gauche - Paris
 2011 ; Du dessin à la sculpture, Galerie Arrêt sur l'image - Bordeaux
 Zigor sculptures, Galerie Hegoa, Carré Rive Gauche - Paris
 2010 ; Formes nues, Base sous-marine - Bordeaux
 2009 ; Jardins jardin, Jardin des Tuileries - Paris
 2007 ; Art Paris, Grand Palais - Paris
 2006 ; Villa Beatrix Enea - Anglet
 2003 ; Maison de la Culture - Ostabat
 2002 ; Musée Basque et de l'Histoire de Bayonne - Bayonne
 Espace Atlantica – Biarritz
 Galeria Epelde & Mardaras - Bilbao
 2000 ; Espace muséal du Bellevue - Biarritz
 1994 ; Palais des Festivals - Biarritz
 1990 ; Musée Bonnat - Bayonne

Zigor is represented by the Maison Gerard Gallery in New York

Photography, major exhibitions 
 2021 ; Egu iturria, la source de l'aube, Espace muséal du Bellevue - Biarritz
 2019 ; Mendiak eta itsasoa, montagnes et mer, Galerie Hegoa - Paris
 2018 ; Itzaletik at, Médiathèque - Biarritz
 2015 ; Jardins dévoilés, Base Sous-Marine - Bordeaux
 2013 ; Zigor photographies, Galerie Hegoa, Carré Rive Gauche – Paris

Zigor is represented by Galerie Hegoa in Paris

Monumental sculptures, private collections 
 2021 ; Gurutze XI - Église Saint-Rémi, Bordeaux
 2020 ; Bikote VIII - New York, USA
 Hega VII - Mont de Marsan, France
 2018 ; Dantza IV - Lahonce, France 
 Olerki XVIII - Guethary, France
 2017 ; Loturak VI - Echichens, Switzerland
 2016 ; Alea III - Washington, USA
 2015 ; Alea I - Saint-Paul-de-Vence, France
 Olerki VII - Sydney, Australia
 2013 ; Gurutze III - Lahonce, France
 2012 ; Etxea - Urrugne, France
 2010 ; Lore - Pomerol, France et Mendoza, Argentine
 2008 ; Dantza - Guéthary, France
 1998 ; Bikote VIII – La Petite Escalère - Saint-Laurent-de-Gosse, France

Monumental sculptures, public collections 
 2015  ; La fontaine Urkulu - Biarritz, France
 2011 ; Txoria - Anglet, France
 Olerki VII - Biarritz, France
 2002 ; Eguskilore - Musée Basque et de l'Histoire de Bayonne - Bayonne, France
 2004 ; Olatua - Museo Maritimo – Bilbao, Spain
 1990 ; Bikote - Museo de Bellas Artes de Alava – Vitoria, Spain

Publications (edit) 
 2021 ; Egu iturria, la source de l'aube, sculptures, peintures, poésie et photographies - Kilika éditions
 2019 ; Carnet de dessin, dessins - Maison Gérard éditions
 2018 ; Itzalean ikusi, voir dans l'ombre, sculptures, peintures et poésie - Kilika éditions
 2016 ; Silences, photographies et poésie - Kilika éditions
 2010 ; Zigor Kepa Akixo, sculptures - Atlantica Séguier éditions
 2007 ; Zigor carnet, dessins - Atlantica Séguier éditions
 2000 ; Zigor Kepa Akixo, sculptures et dessins - Atlantica Séguier éditions.

Annual edition of poems in the publications Maiatz and Poesiaren Hatsa

Documentary films (edit) 
 2019 ; Exposition Mendiak eta itsasoa, Galerie Hegoa Paris artsinthecity
 2018 ; Itzalean ikusi, Boisakré Production
 Exposition Itzalean Ikusi, TVPI
 Zigor à Biarritz, Itzalean Ikusi, Maria Mangas
 2017 ; Portrait, Txirrita France 3
 2017 ; Zalmaltzain, fresque éphémère, Olivier Péant
 Fresque éphémère, Corrida Goyesque, TVPI
 2011 ; Zigor, sculpteur basque, un film de Caroline de Otero Boisakré Production
 2010 ; Le monde de Zigor, France 3.

References

External links 
 Maison Gérard
 Galerie Hegoa
 Kilika éditions

People from Biarritz
1947 births
Living people
21st-century French sculptors
20th-century French sculptors